WCCV-TV (channel 54) is a religious independent television station licensed to Arecibo, Puerto Rico. The station is owned by the Asociacion Evangelistica Cristo Viene, Inc. The station maintains studios located at Barrio Membrillo in Camuy with transmitter facilities at Cerro Roncador in Utuado.

History

WCCV-TV
WCCV-TV began operations in 1982 as WATX-TV, and was an independent with local programming. It was owned by Bay Industries. In 1984, WATX-TV, became a satellite of WSJU (channel 18), later in 1987, to WRWR-TV (channel 30). On January 7, 1988, televangelist Yiye Avila bought WATX-TV for $40,000; the sale was completed on August 25, 1988. In 1989, WATX-TV changed its callsign to WCCV-TV and became a religious network known as La Cadena del Milagro.

WVSN
WVSN (channel 68) began operations on March 12, 1984, and was the first independent television station that broadcast music videos from the 60s, 70s & 80s based in Humacao. WVSN was owned by Radio Voz, until its closure on August 6, 1986. On October 30, 1986, WVSN resumed broadcasting, operating under the station general manager, Tito Atiles Natal, and was broadcasting music videos and local programming. In the 1990s, Yiye Avila bought WVSN for $20,000 and it became a repeater of WCCV-TV, La Cadena del Milagro. Currently, WVSN has its studios and offices located in Caparra Terrace in San Juan with its transmitter at Barrio Cubuy in Canovanas.

Satellite and translator stations
WCCV-TV can be seen across Puerto Rico on the following stations:

W30ED-D (virtual channel 44, UHF digital channel 30) in Guayama (formerly W44CS-D 44)
W13DI-D (virtual channel 54, VHF digital channel 13) in Yauco
W16DX-D (virtual channel 54, UHF digital channel 16) in Aguada (formerly W49CZ-D 49)
WVSN (virtual channel 68, UHF digital channel 23) in Humacao
W16CW-D (virtual channel 54, UHF digital channel 16) in Villalba
W16EG-D (virtual channel 68, UHF digital channel 16) in Cidra
W17DL-D (virtual channel 68, UHF digital channel 17) in Toa Baja
W17EP-D (virtual channel 68, UHF digital channel 17) in Yabucoa
W18DQ-D (virtual channel 54, UHF digital channel 18) in Santa Isabel
W18DZ-D (virtual channel 35, UHF digital channel 18) in Ceiba
W18EN-D (virtual channel 68, UHF digital channel 18) in Sion Farm, USVI (formerly W24DO-D 24)
W19EP-D (virtual channel 68, UHF digital channel 19) in Culebra (formerly W24DW-D 24)
W19EY-D (virtual channel 54, UHF digital channel 19) in Toa Baja (formerly W25EF-D 25)
W22FA-D (virtual channel 54, UHF digital channel 22) in Mayagüez (formerly W32DZ-D 32)
W22FF-D (virtual channel 35, UHF digital channel 22) in Camuy
W31EJ-D (virtual channel 68, UHF digital channel 31) in Tutu, USVI (formerly W33DD-D 33)
W32FB-D (virtual channel 68, UHF digital channel 32) in Ceiba) (formerly W23EM-D 23)
W33ED-D (virtual channel 68, UHF digital channel 33) in Vieques (formerly W34DY-D 34)
W34FK-D (virtual channel 54, UHF digital channel 34) in Añasco (formerly W33CY-D 33)

WVSN and W30ED-D are owned by La Cadena del Milagro, while W13DI-D & W16DX-D are owned by Asociación Evangelistica Cristo Viene. Other translator stations are owned & operated by TV Red de Puerto Rico, Inc.

Digital television

Digital channels
The station's digital signal is multiplexed:

Subchannels of WCCV-TV

Subchannels of WVSN-TV

Analog-to-digital conversion
On February 17, 2009, WCCV-TV & WVSN-DT signed off its analog signal and completed its move to digital.

References

External links
La Cadena del Milagro

Television channels and stations established in 1982
1982 establishments in Puerto Rico
Christian television stations in Puerto Rico
Arecibo, Puerto Rico